Demi Isaac Oviawe (born 2 November 2000) is an Irish actress. She is best known for her role as Linda Walsh in the RTÉ and BBC comedy The Young Offenders (2018–2020).

In 2017, the Irish Examiner named Oviawe as one of their annual "Ones to Watch for 2018".

She appeared on the 2019 series of the Irish edition of Dancing with the Stars. She was eliminated on 17 February, making her the fourth celebrity to be voted off.

Early life
Oviawe was born in Benin City and moved to Ireland at two where she grew up in the County Cork town of Mallow. Oviawe's parents, Joy and Joe, named her after the actress Demi Moore. They had two sons upon moving to Ireland. Oviawe lost her mother at five and her father at 15, both to cancer. She and her brothers were taken care of by their Irish stepmother Kim Carroll, with whom their father had two more sons, and their paternal uncle Courage.

Oviawe attended Mallow No 1 National School and then Davis College, completing her Leaving Cert in 2019. She first discovered acting at the former when she was cast as Mary in the school's nativity play. At the latter, she played camogie and Gaelic Football, and starred in school productions of Beauty and the Beast, Grease and Sister Act. Initially, Oviawe planned to train as a secondary school teacher. However, in 2017 she auditioned on YouTube for a role in the TV series The Young Offenders, and won the role of Linda Walsh.

Filmography

Television

Film

References

External links
 

Living people
2000 births
21st-century Irish actresses
21st-century Nigerian actresses
Actors from County Cork
Actresses from Benin City
Black Irish people
Irish film actresses
Irish television actresses
Nigerian emigrants to Ireland
Nigerian film actresses
Nigerian television actresses
People from Mallow, County Cork